Twin City is a city in Emanuel County, Georgia, United States. As of the 2020 census, the city had a population of 1,642.

History
Twin City gets its name from the combining of two adjacent towns, Graymont and Summit. The two rival towns were merged in 1924 as Twin City.

Of Twin City's  area,  is included in the Twin City Historic District, listed on the National Register of Historic Places. This includes the historic jail and former city hall building

Geography

Twin City is located in eastern Emanuel County at  (32.580420, -82.157776). U.S. Route 80 passes through the city, leading west  to Swainsboro, the county seat, and east  to Statesboro.

Demographics

2020 census

As of the 2020 United States census, there were 1,642 people, 559 households, and 333 families residing in the city.

2000 census
As of the census of 2000, there were 1,752 people, 545 households, and 390 families residing in the city. The racial makeup of the city was 53.60% African American, 45.66% White, 0.40% from other races, and 0.34% from two or more races. Hispanic or Latino of any race were 1.26% of the population.

There were 545 households, out of which 39.6% had children under the age of 18 living with them, 45.7% were married couples living together, 20.2% had a female householder with no husband present, and 28.3% were non-families. 25.3% of all households were made up of individuals, and 12.8% had someone living alone who was 65 years of age or older.  The average household size was 2.65 and the average family size was 3.16.

In the city, the population was spread out, with 26.1% under the age of 18, 12.0% from 18 to 24, 28.5% from 25 to 44, 19.2% from 45 to 64, and 14.2% who were 65 years of age or older.  The median age was 35 years. For every 100 females, there were 113.4 males.  For every 100 females age 18 and over, there were 117.1 males.

The median income for a household in the city was $21,348, and the median income for a family was $24,861. Males had a median income of $23,661 versus $13,370 for females. The per capita income for the city was $9,813.  About 22.3% of families and 30.0% of the population were below the poverty line, including 28.1% of those under age 18 and 44.1% of those age 65 or over.

Schools 
Emanuel County Institute & Twin City Elementary

Emanuel County Institute consists of two schools, a middle school for grades six through eight and a high school for grades nine through twelve. It serves the communities of Twin City, Canoochee, Garfield, and Stillmore. It was founded in 1903 through a joint effort by the citizens of Summit and Graymont. Contributions were collected, and a school bond was financed by eight private investors. This was the first school bond ever used to finance construction of a public school in Georgia. Progressive financing continued to be initiated by ECI as the first state funds for agriculture and home economics were used here in 1915.

Twin City Elementary (TCE) a school that holds Pre Kindergarten - fifth grade. It also serves the communities  of Twin City, Canoochee, Garfield, and Stillmore

Attractions 
George L. Smith State Park is located in Emanuel County, and is known for its Parrish Mill and Pond, a combination grist mill, saw mill, covered bridge and dam built in 1880 and now open for tours. Anglers and canoeists can explore the mill pond dotted with Spanish moss-draped trees and home to blue heron and white ibis. Hikers can walk seven miles of trails while searching for gopher tortoises, Georgia's state reptile.

Notable people
 Johnny Archer, professional pool player
 Ginny Wright, country music singer

References

Cities in Georgia (U.S. state)
Cities in Emanuel County, Georgia